Mumcu (from the Turkish noun mum ("candle") followed by the actuator suffix -cu, therefore literally "chandler") is a Turkish surname. Notable people with the surname include:

 Ali Mumcu, Turkish footballer
 Erkan Mumcu, Turkish politician
 Güldal Mumcu (born 1951), Turkish politician
 Uğur Mumcu (1942–1993), Turkish investigative journalist

Turkish-language surnames